The first season of the American post-apocalyptic drama series Black Summer was released by Netflix on April 11, 2019, with 8 episodes. The series is produced by The Asylum, the same production company behind Z Nation, is written and directed primarily by John Hyams, and featured 9 starring roles, most notably being Jaime King in the lead role as Rose, a mother who is separated from her daughter during the earliest and most deadly days of a zombie apocalypse. Other stars in the season include Justin Chu Cary & Gwynyth Walsh.

On November 20, 2019, the series was renewed for a second season consisting of eight episodes.

Episodes

Cast and characters

Starring 

 Jaime King as Rose, a woman on the search for her daughter Anna, she also leads her own group of survivors attempting to get to the stadium
 Justin Chu Cary as Julius James, a criminal who takes the identity of military officer "Spears" and helps Rose find her daughter 
 Christine Lee as Ooh "Sun" Kyungsun, a Korean woman who is searching for her mother
 Kelsey Flower as Lance, a clumsy lone survivor who is briefly a member of Rose’s group
 Sal Velez Jr as William Velez, a man who has/had children and a sister in Texas, he befriends Sun & Barbara and is briefly a member of Rose’s group
 Erika Hau as Carmen, Manny’s girlfriend
 Gwynyth Walsh as Barbara Watson, a Christian woman who befriends William & Sun
 Mustafa Alabssi as Ryan, a lone deaf survivor
 Edsson Morales as Manny, Carmen’s boyfriend

Recurring 
 Zoe Marlett as Anna, Rose’s daughter
 Nyren B Evelyn as Earl, a quiet survivor who is briefly a member of Rose’s group
 Stafford Perry as Phil, a man traveling with Carmen, Manny & Marvin
 Christian Fraser as Marvin, a man driving a pick-up-truck who causes a crash that kills himself and Barbara
 Nathaniel Arcand as Governale, a soldier who is after Julius for stealing the identity of Spears
 Tom Carey as Bronk, a soldier who is after Julius for stealing the identity of Spears

Guest 
 Ty Olsson as Patrick, Rose’s husband and Anna’s father
 Lonni Olson as Ben, a man who tries to steal Barbara’s car on the road
 David Haysom as Spears, a soldier who Spears kills

Reception 
The first season holds an approval rating of 78% based on 18 reviews, with an average rating of 6.14/10. The website's critical consensus reads, "Black Summer has enough undead carnage and a sinewy pace to please zombie fans, but the series suffers from scant characterization and doesn't add much storytelling meat to the genre's gnawed-on bone." Horror writer Stephen King praised Black Summer, stating: "Just when you think there's no more scare left in zombies, THIS comes along. Existential hell in the suburbs, stripped to the bone." The New York Times wrote, “If Andrei Tarkovsky and John Carpenter had teamed up to direct a zombie show, it might have looked something like this formally daring Netflix series.” In April 2019, Black Summer was the most watched show on Netflix in the United Kingdom.

Production

Development 
On July 19, 2018, it was reported that Netflix had given an 8-episode, straight-to-series order for a "spin-off" prequel series to Syfy's Z Nation, titled Black Summer. The series was created by Z Nation co-creator and executive producer Karl Schaefer alongside the flagship series' co-executive producer John Hyams. Schaefer and Hyams also serve as showrunners for the prequel series.

Casting 
Alongside the series' order in July 2018, Jaime King was confirmed to star in the lead role. On July 29, King announced via her Instagram account that Justin Chu Cary would portray a character named Spears. On August 7, Kelsey Flower revealed that he had joined the cast as Lance and described his character as "the guy that's terrible at the Apocalypse. You'd think he'd be the first to die." On August 16, Gwynyth Walsh and Christine Lee were reported to have joined the cast in undisclosed roles. On October 13, it was reported that deaf Syrian refugee Mustafa Alabssi had been cast as Ryan, a deaf character. Sal Velez, Jr. will also star in the series as William Velez. Erika Hau will have a recurring role in the series.

Writing
At the 2018 San Diego Comic-Con, Schaefer noted that "Black Summer is before the apocalypse got weird and was just scary." He said that the horror series is not intended to be the funny version of The Walking Dead that Z Nation is, but would instead be more of an "old-school" take on zombie lore. This was echoed by producer Jodi Binstock, who stated that the series is "not tongue-in-cheek, it's very very serious: it's as if the zombie apocalypse really happened in 2018 and explores what that would be for all of us."

As the series does not feature any of the characters from Z Nation, Binstock later distanced the series from the "spin-off" label, explaining that "Black Summer is referred to in Z Nation as the summer where everything went to hell, so that is where Black Summer picks up." Elaborating, Schaefer described the events of Black Summer as "the low point of the apocalypse" and established it as taking place "about four months into the apocalypse, [...] when 95% of the population dies over the course of the summer." Within that context, Hyams stated that the "essence" of the story is about a mother being separated from her daughter. "The story is: what would a mother do to find her child? And what we learn is that she would do anything." Hyams, who wrote the majority of the series' episodes, also said that the series would explore the idea of an American refugee crisis. Schaefer, Abram Cox, and Daniel Schaefer will also write episodes for the series.

Schaefer stated that the series is not going to be episodic, but will instead be an 8-hour "chunk" to work through. This was confirmed by Binstock, who added that Black Summer would employ "a completely different approach" than Z Nation, "in that it's much more like a chapter in a book. You don't necessarily do the cliffhangers on a commercial break – it's keeping you going so that you've got to binge it."

Filming
Production for the first season had officially commenced by July 23, 2018 in and around Calgary, Alberta, with filming partially taking place at Queen Elizabeth High School, Stampede Park, McMahon Stadium and under the Calgary Tower. The series continued production in the smaller communities of Irricana, Beiseker and Cochrane before returning to Calgary in mid-to-late September. On September 26, it was reported that King had been hospitalized for three days due to injuries sustained while on set, with King simultaneously confirming that production for the series had wrapped. John Hyams directed the majority of the series' episodes. Abram Cox will also serve as a director on the series.

References 

2019 American television seasons